Prajapati is a Vedic deity of Hinduism. 

In later literature, Prajapati is identified with the creator-god Brahma, but the term also connotes many different gods, depending on the Hindu text, ranging from being the creator god to being same as one of the following: Vishvakarma, Agni, Indra, Daksha, and many others, reflecting the diverse Hindu cosmology. In classical and medieval era literature, Prajapati is equated to the metaphysical concept called Brahman as Prajapati-Brahman (Svayambhu Brahman), or alternatively Brahman is described as one who existed before Prajapati.

Etymology
Prajapati is a compound of "praja" (creation, procreative powers) and "pati" (lord, master). The term means "lord of creatures", or "lord of all born beings". In the later Vedic texts, Prajapati is a distinct Vedic deity, but whose significance diminishes. Later, the term is synonymous with other gods, particularly Brahma. Still later, the term evolves to mean any divine, semi-divine or human sages who create something new.

Origins

The origins of Prajapati are unclear. He appears late in the Vedic layer of texts, and the hymns that mention him provide different cosmological theories in different chapters. He is missing from the Samhita layer of Vedic literature, conceived in the Brahmana layer, states Jan Gonda. Prajapati is younger than Savitr, and the word was originally an epithet for the sun. His profile gradually rises in the Vedas, peaking within the Brahmanas. Scholars such as Renou, Keith and Bhattacharji posit Prajapati originated as an abstract or semi-abstract deity in the later Vedic milieu as speculations evolved from the archaic to more learned speculations.

Indo-European
A possible connection between Prajapati (and related figures in Indian tradition) and the Prōtogonos (literally "first-born") of the Greek Orphic tradition has been proposed:

According to Robert Graves, the name of /PRA-JĀ[N]-pati/ ('progeny-potentate') is etymologically equivalent to that of the oracular god at Colophon (according to Makrobios), namely /prōtogonos/. The cosmic egg concept linked to Prajapati and Protogonos is common in many parts of the world, states David Leeming, which appears in later Orphic cult in Greece.

Texts
Prajapati is described in many ways and inconsistently in Hindu texts, both in the Vedas and in the post-Vedic texts. These range from being the creator god to being same as one of the following: Brahma, Agni, Indra, Vishvakarma, Daksha and many others.

Vedas
His role varies within the Vedic texts such as being one who created heaven and earth, all of water and beings, the chief, the father of gods, the creator of devas and asuras, the cosmic egg and the Purusha (spirit). His role peaked in the Brahmanas layer of Vedic text, then declined to being a group of helpers in the creation process. In some Brahmana texts, his role remains ambiguous since he co-creates with the powers with goddess Vāc (sound).

In the Rigveda, Prajapati appears as an epithet for Savitr, Soma, Agni and Indra, who are all praised as equal, same and lord of creatures. Elsewhere, in hymn 10.121 of the Rigveda, is described Hiranyagarbha (golden embryo) that was born from the waters containing everything, which produced Prajapati. It then created manah (mind), kama (desire) and tapas (heat). However, this Prajapati is a metaphor, one of many Hindu cosmology theories, and there is no supreme deity in the Rigveda. One of the striking features about the Hindu Prajapati myths, states Jan Gonda, is the idea that work of creation is a gradual process, completed in stages of trial and improvement.

In the Shatapatha Brahmana, embedded inside the Yajurveda, Prajapati emanated from Purusha (cosmic spirit) and Prajapati co-creates the world with the goddess of Language. It also includes the "golden cosmic egg" mythology, wherein Prajapati is stated to be born from a golden egg in primeval sea after the egg was incubated for a year. His sounds became the sky, the earth and the seasons. When he inhaled, he created the devas (gods), fire and light. When he exhaled, he created the asuras (demons) and darkness. Then, together with the goddess of Language, he created all beings and time. In Chapter 10 of the Shatapatha Brahmana, as well as chapter 13 of Pancavimsa Brahmana, is presented another theory wherein he (Prajapati) is a mother, becomes self-pregnant with all living creatures self-generated, then evil Mrtyu seizes these beings within his womb, but because these beings are part of the eternal Prajapati, they desire to live long like him.

The Aitareya Brahmana offers a different myth, wherein Prajapati, having created the gods, metamorphosed into a stag and approached his daughter Dawn who was in the form of a doe, to produce other earthly beings. The gods were horrified by the incest, and joined forces to produce angry destructive Rudra to punish Prajapati for "doing what is not done". Prajapati was killed by Rudra. The Kausitaki Brahmana offers yet another myth, wherein Prajapati created from his own self fire, sun, moon, wind and feminine dawn. The first four saw dawn and released their seeds, which became existence (Bhava).

In section 2.266 of Jaiminiya Brahmana, Prajapati is presented as a spiritual teacher. His student Varuna lives with him for 100 years, studying the art and duties of being the "father-like king of gods".

Upanishads
Prajapati appears in early Upanishads, among the most influential texts in Hinduism. He is described in the Upanishads in diverse ways. For example, in different Upanishads, he is presented as the personification of creative power after Brahman, the same as the wandering eternal soul, as symbolism for unmanifest obscure first born, as manifest procreative sexual powers, the knower particularly of Atman (soul, self), and a spiritual teacher that is within each person. The Chandogya Upanishad, as an illustration, presents him as follows:

In Chandogya Upanishad 1.2.1, Prajapati appears as the creator (father) of all gods and asuras: "The gods and the demons are both children of Prajāpati, yet they fought among themselves".

Post-Vedic texts
In the Mahabharata, Brahma is declared to be a Prajapati who creates many males and females, and imbues them with desire and anger, the former to drive them into reproducing themselves and the latter to prevent them from being like gods. Other chapters of the epics and Puranas declare Shiva or Vishnu to be Prajapati.

The Bhagavad Gita uses the epithet Prajapati to describe Krishna, along with many other epithets.

The Grhyasutras include Prajapati as among the deities invoked during wedding ceremonies and prayed to for blessings of prosperous progeny, and harmony between husband and wife.

Prajapati is identified with the personifications of Time, Fire, the Sun, etc. He is also identified with various mythical progenitors, especially (Manu Smrti 1.34) the ten lords of created beings first created by Brahmā: the Prajapatis Marichi, Atri, Angiras, Pulastya, Pulaha, Kratu, Vasishtha, Prachetas or Daksha, Bhrigu and Nārada.

In the Puranas, there are groups of Prajapati called Prajapatayah who were rishis (sages) or "grandfathers" from whom all of humanity resulted, followed by a Prajapatis list that widely varies in number and name between different texts. According to George Williams, the inconsistent, varying and evolving Prajapati concept in Hindu mythology reflects the diverse Hindu cosmology.

The Mahabharata and the genre of Puranas call various gods and sages as Prajapati. Some illustrations, states Roshen Dalal, include Agni, Bharata, Shashabindu, Shukra, Havirdhaman, Indra, Kapila, Kshupa, Prithu-Vainya, Soma, Svishtakrit, Tvashtr, Vishvakarma and Virana.

In the medieval era texts of Hinduism, Prajapati refers to legendary agents of creation, working as gods or sages, who appear in every cycle of creation-maintenance-destruction (manvantara). Their numbers vary between seven, ten, sixteen or twenty-one.

A list of twenty one includes

 Rudra, 
 Manu, 
 Daksha, 
 Bhrigu, 
 Dharma, 
 Tapa, 
 Yama, 
 Marici, 
 Angiras, 
 Atri, 
 Pulastya, 
 Pulaha, 
 Kratu, 
 Vasishtha, 
 Parameshti, 
 Surya, 
 Chandra, 
 Kardama, 
 Krodha and 
 Vikrita.

A list of sixteen found in the Ramayana includes

 Angiras, 
 Arishtanemi, 
 Atri, 
 Daksha, 
 Kardama, 
 Kashyapa, 
 Kratu, 
 Marichi, 
 Prachetas, 
 Pulaha, 
 Pulastya, 
 Samshraya, 
 Shesha, 
   —
 Vikrita 
 Vivasvan.

A list of ten includes

 Marichi, 
 Angiras, 
 Atri, 
 Pulastya, 
 Pulaha, 
 Kratu, 
 Vasishtha, 
 Daksha (or Prachetas), 
 Bhrigu
 Narada.

Their creative role varies. Pulaha, for example, is the mythical mind-born son of Brahma and a great rishi. As one of the Prajapatis, he helps create living wildlife such as lions, tigers, bears, wolves, as well as mythical beasts such as kimpurushas and shalabhas.

Balinese Hinduism
Hindu temples in Bali Indonesia called Pura Prajapati, also called Pura Mrajapati, are common. They are most associated with funeral rituals and the Ngaben (cremation) ceremony for the dead.

See also
Nasadiya sukta
Hiranyagarbha sukta
Hinduism and monotheism
List of Hindu deities
Creation myth
Saptarishi

References

Further reading
Dictionary of Hindu Lore and Legend by Anna Dhallapiccola

External links
Prajapati: Hindu Deity, Encyclopaedia Britannica

Hindu gods
 
Nature gods
Creator gods
Nature gods in Hinduism